Geary (2001 population: 2,680) is a Canadian rural community in Sunbury County, New Brunswick. It is often considered to be in four small parts: Haneytown, Waterville-Sunbury, Geary, and French Lake.

It is located south of Oromocto and borders the Oromocto River to the west and C.F.B. Gagetown training area to the south and east.

Geary is best known as being the location of Speedway 660, the largest auto racing track in Atlantic Canada.

History

Notable people

See also
List of communities in New Brunswick

References

Communities in Sunbury County, New Brunswick